Elamite, also known as Hatamtite and formerly as Susian, is an extinct language that was spoken by the ancient Elamites. It was used in what is now southwestern Iran from 2600 BC to 330 BC. Elamite works disappear from the archeological record after Alexander the Great entered Iran. Elamite is generally thought to have no demonstrable relatives and is usually considered a language isolate. The lack of established relatives makes its interpretation difficult.

A sizeable number of Elamite lexemes are known from the trilingual Behistun inscription and numerous other bilingual or trilingual inscriptions of the Achaemenid Empire, in which Elamite was written using Elamite cuneiform (circa 400 BC), which is fully deciphered. An important dictionary of the Elamite language, the Elamisches Wörterbuch was published in 1987 by W. Hinz and H. Koch. The Linear Elamite script however, one of the scripts used to write the Elamite language circa 2000 BC, has remained elusive until recently.

Writing system

Two early scripts of the area remain undeciphered but plausibly have encoded Elamite:
Proto-Elamite is the oldest known writing system from Iran. It was used during a brief period of time (c. 3100–2900 BC); clay tablets with Proto-Elamite writing have been found at different sites across Iran. It is thought to have developed from early cuneiform (proto-cuneiform) and consists of more than 1,000 signs. It is thought to be largely logographic. 
Linear Elamite is attested in a few monumental inscriptions. It is often claimed that Linear Elamite is a syllabic writing system derived from Proto-Elamite, but it cannot be proven. Linear Elamite was used for a very brief period of time during the last quarter of the third millennium BC.

Later, Elamite cuneiform, adapted from Akkadian cuneiform, was used from c. 2500 to 331 BC. Elamite cuneiform was largely a syllabary of some 130 glyphs at any one time and retained only a few logograms from Akkadian but, over time, the number of logograms increased. The complete corpus of Elamite cuneiform consists of about 20,000 tablets and fragments. The majority belong to the Achaemenid era, and contain primarily economic records.

Linguistic typology
Elamite is an agglutinative language, and its grammar was characterized by an extensive and pervasive nominal class system. Animate nouns have separate markers for first, second
and third person. It can be said to display a kind of Suffixaufnahme in that the nominal class markers of the head are also attached to any modifiers, including adjectives, noun adjuncts, possessor nouns and even entire clauses.

History

The history of Elamite is periodised as follows:

 Old Elamite (c. 2600–1500 BC)
 Middle Elamite (c. 1500–1000 BC)
 Neo-Elamite (1000–550 BC)
 Achaemenid Elamite (550–330 BC)

Middle Elamite is considered the “classical” period of Elamite, but the best attested variety is Achaemenid Elamite, which was widely used by the Achaemenid Persian state for official inscriptions as well as administrative records and displays significant Old Persian influence.

Persepolis Administrative Archives were found at Persepolis in 1930s, and they are mostly in Elamite; the remains of more than 10,000 of these cuneiform documents have been uncovered. In comparison, Aramaic is represented by only 1,000 or so original records. These documents represent administrative activity and flow of data in Persepolis over more than fifty consecutive years (509 to 457 BC).

Documents from the Old Elamite and early Neo-Elamite stages are rather scarce.

Neo-Elamite can be regarded as a transition between Middle and Achaemenid Elamite, with respect to language structure.

The Elamite language may have remained in widespread use after the Achaemenid period. Several rulers of Elymais bore the Elamite name Kamnaskires in the 2nd and 1st centuries BC. The Acts of the Apostles (c. 80–90 AD) mentions the language as if it was still current. There are no later direct references, but Elamite may be the local language in which, according to the Talmud, the Book of Esther was recited annually to the Jews of Susa in the Sasanian period (224–642 AD). Between the 9th and 13th centuries AD, various Arabic authors refer to a language called Khuzi spoken in Khuzistan, which was not any other language known to those writers. It is possible that it was "a late variant of Elamite".

Phonology
Because of the limitations of the language's scripts, its phonology is not well understood.

Roots were generally CV, (C)VC, (C)VCV or, more rarely, CVCCV (the first C was usually a nasal).

Morphology
Elamite is agglutinative but with fewer morphemes per word than, for example, Sumerian or Hurrian and Urartian and it is mostly suffixing.

Nouns
The Elamite nominal system is thoroughly pervaded by a noun class distinction, which combines a gender distinction between animate and inanimate with a personal class distinction, corresponding to the three persons of verbal inflection (first, second, third, plural). 
The suffixes are as follows: 
Animate: 
1st person singular: -k
2nd person singular: -t
3rd person singular: -r or Ø
3rd person plural: -p

Inanimate: 
-∅, -me, -n, -t

The animate third-person suffix -r can serve as a nominalizing suffix and indicate nomen agentis or just members of a class. The inanimate third-person singular suffix -me forms abstracts: sunki-k “a king (first person)” i.e. “I, a king”, sunki-r “a king (third person)”, nap-Ø or nap-ir “a god (third person)”, sunki-p “kings”, nap-ip “gods”, sunki-me “kingdom, kingship”, hal-Ø “town, land”, siya-n “temple”, hala-t “mud brick”.

Modifiers follow their (nominal) heads. In noun phrases and pronoun phrases, the suffixes referring to the head are appended to the modifier, regardless of whether the modifier is another noun (such as a possessor) or an adjective. Sometimes the suffix is preserved on the head as well:

u šak X-k(i) = “I, the son of X”

X šak Y-r(i) = “X, the son of Y”

u sunki-k Hatamti-k = “I, the king of Elam”

sunki Hatamti-p (or, sometimes, sunki-p Hatamti-p) = “the kings of Elam”

temti riša-r = “great lord” (lit. “lord great”)

riša-r nap-ip-ir = “greatest of the gods” (lit. "great of the gods")

nap-ir u-ri = my god (lit. “god of me”)

hiya-n nap-ir u-ri-me = the throne hall of my god 

takki-me puhu nika-me-me = “the life of our children”

sunki-p uri-p u-p(e) = ”kings, my predecessors” (lit. “kings, predecessors of me”)

This system, in which the noun class suffixes function as derivational morphemes as well as agreement markers and indirectly as subordinating morphemes, is best seen in Middle Elamite. It was, to a great extent, broken down in Achaemenid Elamite, where possession and, sometimes, attributive relationships are uniformly expressed with the “genitive case” suffix -na appended to the modifier: e.g. šak X-na “son of X”. The suffix -na, which probably originated from the inanimate agreement suffix -n followed by the nominalizing particle -a (see below), appeared already in Neo-Elamite.

The personal pronouns distinguish nominative and accusative case forms. They are as follows:

In general, no special possessive pronouns are needed in view of the construction with the noun class suffixes. Nevertheless, a set of separate third-person animate possessives -e (sing.) / appi-e (plur.) is occasionally used already in Middle Elamite: puhu-e “her children”, hiš-api-e “their name”. The relative pronouns are akka “who” and appa “what, which”.

Verbs

The verb base can be simple (ta- “put”) or “reduplicated” (beti > bepti “rebel”). The pure verb base can function as a verbal noun, or “infinitive”.

The verb distinguishes three forms functioning as finite verbs, known as “conjugations”. Conjugation I is the only one with special endings characteristic of finite verbs as such, as shown below. Its use is mostly associated with active voice, transitivity (or verbs of motion), neutral aspect and past tense meaning. Conjugations II and III can be regarded as periphrastic constructions with participles; they are formed by the addition of the nominal personal class suffixes to a passive perfective participle in -k and to an active imperfective participle in -n, respectively. Accordingly, conjugation II expresses a perfective aspect, hence usually past tense, and an intransitive or passive voice, whereas conjugation III expresses an imperfective non-past action.

The Middle Elamite conjugation I is formed with the following suffixes:

 Examples: kulla-h ”I prayed”, hap-t ”you heard”, hutta-š “he did”, kulla-hu “we prayed”, hutta-h-t “you (plur.) did”, hutta-h-š “they did”.

In Achaemenid Elamite, the loss of the /h/ reduces the transparency of the Conjugation I endings and leads to the merger of the singular and plural except in the first person; in addition, the first-person plural changes from -hu to -ut.

The participles can be exemplified as follows: perfective participle hutta-k “done”, kulla-k “something prayed”, i.e. “a prayer”; imperfective participle hutta-n “doing” or “who will do”, also serving as a non-past infinitive. The corresponding conjugations (conjugation II and III) are:

In Achaemenid Elamite, the Conjugation 2 endings are somewhat changed:

There is also a periphrastic construction with an auxiliary verb ma- following either Conjugation II and III stems (i.e. the perfective and imperfective participles), or nomina agentis in -r, or a verb base directly. In Achaemenid Elamite, only the third option exists. There is no consensus on the exact meaning of the periphrastic forms with ma-, but durative, intensive or volitional interpretations have been suggested.

The optative is expressed by the addition of the suffix -ni to Conjugations I and II. 

The imperative is identical to the second person of Conjugation I in Middle Elamite. In Achaemenid Elamite, it is the third person that coincides with the imperative. 

The prohibitative is formed by the particle ani/ani preceding Conjugation III.

Verbal forms can be converted into the heads of subordinate clauses through the addition of the nominalising suffix -a, much as in Sumerian: siyan in-me kuši-hš(i)-me-a “the temple which they did not build”. -ti/-ta can be suffixed to verbs, chiefly of conjugation I, expressing possibly a meaning of anteriority (perfect and pluperfect tense).

The negative particle is in-; it takes nominal class suffixes that agree with the subject of attention (which may or may not coincide with the grammatical subject): first-person singular in-ki, third-person singular animate in-ri, third-person singular inanimate in-ni/in-me. In Achaemenid Elamite, the inanimate form in-ni has been generalized to all persons, and concord has been lost.

Syntax
Nominal heads are normally followed by their modifiers, but there are occasional inversions. Word order is subject–object–verb (SOV), with indirect objects preceding direct objects, but it becomes more flexible in Achaemenid Elamite. There are often resumptive pronouns before the verb – often long sequences, especially in Middle Elamite (ap u in duni-h "to-them I it gave").

The language uses postpositions such as -ma "in" and -na "of", but spatial and temporal relationships are generally expressed in Middle Elamite by means of "directional words" originating as nouns or verbs. They can precede or follow the governed nouns and tend to exhibit noun class agreement with whatever noun is described by the prepositional phrase: i-r pat-r u-r ta-t-ni "may you place him under me", lit. "him inferior of-me place-you-may". In Achaemenid Elamite, postpositions become more common and partly displace that type of construction.

A common conjunction is ak "and, or". Achaemenid Elamite also uses a number of subordinating conjunctions such as anka "if, when" and sap "as, when". Subordinate clauses usually precede the verb of the main clause. In Middle Elamite, the most common way to construct a relative clause is to attach a nominal class suffix to the clause-final verb, optionally followed by the relativizing suffix -a: thus, lika-me i-r hani-š-r(i) "whose reign he loves", or optionally lika-me i-r hani-š-r-a. The alternative construction by means of the relative pronouns akka "who" and appa "which" is uncommon in Middle Elamite, but gradually becomes dominant at the expense of the nominal class suffix construction in Achaemenid Elamite.

Language samples
Middle Elamite (Šutruk-Nahhunte I, 1200–1160 BC; EKI 18, IRS 33):

Transliteration:

(1) ú DIŠšu-ut-ru-uk-d.nah-hu-un-te ša-ak DIŠhal-lu-du-uš-din-šu-ši-

(2) -na-ak-gi-ik su-un-ki-ik an-za-an šu-šu-un-ka4 e-ri-en-

(3) -tu4-um ti-pu-uh a-ak hi-ya-an din-šu-ši-na-ak na-pír

(4) ú-ri-me a-ha-an ha-li-ih-ma hu-ut-tak ha-li-ku-me

(5) din-šu-ši-na-ak na-pír ú-ri in li-na te-la-ak-ni

Transcription:

U Šutruk-Nahhunte, šak Halluduš-Inšušinak-ik, sunki-k Anzan Šušun-ka. Erientum tipu-h ak hiya-n Inšušinak nap-ir u-ri-me ahan hali-h-ma. hutta-k hali-k u-me Inšušinak nap-ir u-ri in lina tela-k-ni.

Translation:

I, Šutruk-Nahhunte, son of Halluduš-Inšušinak, king of Anshan and Susa. I moulded bricks and made the throne hall of my god Inšušinak with them. May my work come as an offering to my god Inšušinak.

Achaemenid Elamite (Xerxes I, 486–465 BC; XPa):

Transliteration:

(01) [sect 01] dna-ap ir-šá-ir-ra du-ra-mas-da ak-ka4 AŠmu-ru-un 
(02) hi pè-iš-tá ak-ka4 dki-ik hu-ip-pè pè-iš-tá ak-ka4 DIŠ 
(03) LÚ.MEŠ-ir-ra ir pè-iš-tá ak-ka4 ši-ia-ti-iš pè-iš-tá DIŠ 
(04) LÚ.MEŠ-ra-na ak-ka4 DIŠik-še-ir-iš-šá DIŠEŠŠANA ir hu-ut-taš- 
(05) tá ki-ir ir-še-ki-ip-in-na DIŠEŠŠANA ki-ir ir-še-ki-ip-
(06) in-na pír-ra-ma-ut-tá-ra-na-um

Transcription:

Nap irša-rra Uramasda, akka muru-n hi pe-š-ta, akka kik hupe pe-š-ta, akka ruh(?)-irra ir pe-š-ta, akka šiatiš pe-š-ta ruh(?)-ra-na, akka Ikšerša sunki(?) ir hutta-š-ta kir iršeki-pi-na sunki(?), kir iršeki-pi-na piramataram.

Translation:

A great god is Ahura Mazda, who created this earth, who created that sky, who created man, who created happiness of man, who made Xerxes king, one king of many, one lord of many.

Relations to other language families
Elamite is regarded by the vast majority of linguists as a language isolate, as it has no demonstrable relationship to the neighbouring Semitic languages, Indo-European languages, or to Sumerian, despite having adopted the Sumerian-Akkadian cuneiform script.

An Elamo-Dravidian family connecting Elamite with the Brahui language of Pakistan and Dravidian languages of India was suggested in 1967 by Igor M. Diakonoff and later, in 1974, defended by David McAlpin. In 2012, Southworth proposed that Elamite forms the “Zagrosian family” along with Brahui and, further down the cladogram, the remaining Dravidian languages; this family would have originated in Southwest Asia (southern Iran) and was widely distributed in South Asia and parts of eastern West Asia before the Indo-Aryan migration. Recent discoveries regarding early population migration based on ancient DNA analysis have revived interest in the possible connection between proto-Elamite and proto-Dravidian.

Václav Blažek proposed a relation with the Semitic languages.

In 2002 George Starostin published a lexicostatistic analysis finding Elamite to be approximately equidistant from Nostratic and Semitic.

None of these ideas have been accepted by mainstream historical linguists.

See also
 Gutian language

References

Bibliography

 Khačikjan, Margaret: The Elamite Language, Documenta Asiana IV, Consiglio Nazionale delle Ricerche Istituto per gli Studi Micenei ed Egeo-Anatolici, 1998 .
 Paper H. (1955). The phonology and morphology of Royal Achaemenid Elamite. Ann Arbor: University of Michigan Press.
 Starostin, George: On the genetic affiliation of the Elamite language in Mother Tongue, vol. VII, 2002, pp. 147–17
 Stolper, Matthew W. 2006. Elamite. In: Woodard, Roger D. (ed.). The Cambridge Encyclopedia of the World's Ancient Languages. pp. 60–95.
Republished in Woodard, Roger D. (ed.). 2008. The Ancient Languages of Mesopotamia, Egypt, and Aksum. pp. 60–95.

Further reading
 Basello, Gian Pietro. "Elamite as Administrative Language: From Susa to Persepolis". In: Elam and Persia. Edited by Javier Álvarez-Mon and Mark B. Garrison. University Park, USA: Penn State University Press, 2021 [2011]. pp. 61-88. https://doi.org/10.1515/9781575066127-008

External links

  Part 1: A–H, Part 2: I–Z.
Ancient Scripts: Elamite
Elamisch by Ernst Kausen . An overview of Elamite.
Elamite grammar, glossary, and a very comprehensive text corpus, by Enrique Quintana (in some respects, the author's views deviate from those generally accepted in the field) 
Эламский язык, a detailed description by Igor Diakonov 
Persepolis Fortification Archive (requires Java)
Achaemenid Royal Inscriptions project (the project is discontinued, but the texts, the translations and the glossaries remain accessible on the Internet Archive through the options "Corpus Catalogue" and "Browse Lexicon")
On the genetic affiliation of the Elamite language by George Starostin (the Nostratic theory; also with glossary)
 Elamite and Dravidian: Further Evidence of Relationship by David McAlpin

 
Bronze Age writing systems
Subject–object–verb languages
Language isolates of Asia
Pre-Indo-Europeans
Languages attested from the 3rd millennium BC
Languages extinct in the 3rd millennium BC